Stefan Bajic (born 23 December 2001) is a French professional footballer who plays as goalkeeper for  club Valenciennes, on loan from EFL Championship club Bristol City.

Bajic joined Saint-Étienne at age six, and over the years has climbed through the club's U17, U19 and reserve teams, breaking into the first team at age 18. He has represented France internationally at youth level, from the under-16s to the under-21s, as well as the Olympic team at the 2020 Summer Olympics.

Early life
Bajic was born on 23 December 2001, in Saint-Étienne, France, and is of Serbian descent.

Club career

Saint-Étienne

Youth system
Bajic first joined Saint-Étienne at age six, gradually progressing through the club's youth teams, before finding himself at the under-17 level. His performances in the Championnat National U17 earned him his first international call-up for the France national under-16 football team.

2018–19 season 
On 2 May 2018, Bajic signed his first professional contract, to the end of the 2020–21 season.

On 8 April 2019, Bajic extended his contract for a further year. Bajic also led the club's U19 team through its Coupe Gambardella campaign, which ended with a 2–0 victory over Toulouse's U19 side in the Final on 27 April.

2019–20 season
After assistant coach Ghislain Printant took over from Gasset, Bajic became Saint-Étienne's third choice, surpassing Vermot. Bajic made his senior debut on 25 September 2019, with both Ruffier and Moulin suffering from minor injuries. The game against Metz resulted in Saint-Étienne's fourth defeat in five games, with a scoreline of 1–0. Bajic became the Greens youngest-ever player to start a Ligue 1 match.

2020–21 season
Bajic played in the Coupe de France fixture for the round of 64 on 11 February, against Sochaux, as Moulin felt discomfort in his hamstring, which Saint-Étienne lost 1–0. After Moulin also contracted the disease and later injured his groin, Bajic played his first league game in over a year on 19 March; Saint-Étienne lost 4–0 to Monaco.

Pau
On 4 February 2022, Bajic signed with Pau in Ligue 2.

Bristol City
On 5 July 2022, Bajic signed with Bristol City in the EFL Championship on a three year deal.

On 19 January 2023, Bajic returned to France to join Valenciennes on loan until the end of the season.

International career
Bajic was called up to represent the France national under-19 team at the 2019 UEFA European Under-19 Championship.

Career statistics

HonoursSaint-Étienne B Championnat National 3: 2017–18Saint-Étienne U19'
 Coupe Gambardella: 2018–19

References

External links

 AS Saint-Étienne profile
 
 
 
 UNFP Profile

2001 births
Living people
Footballers from Saint-Étienne
French footballers
France youth international footballers
Association football goalkeepers
AS Saint-Étienne players
Pau FC players
Bristol City F.C. players
Valenciennes FC players
Ligue 1 players
Ligue 2 players
Championnat National 2 players
Championnat National 3 players
Olympic footballers of France
Footballers at the 2020 Summer Olympics
French people of Serbian descent
French expatriate footballers
Expatriate footballers in England
French expatriate sportspeople in England